Kazi Junaid Saifi (born 18 August 1998) is an Indian cricketer. He made his first-class debut on 19 January 2020, for Bengal in the 2019–20 Ranji Trophy. Kazi Junaid was a student of Patha bhavan High school , Kolkata

References

External links
 

1998 births
Living people
Indian cricketers
Bengal cricketers
Place of birth missing (living people)